Homer Nelson may refer to:

 Homer Augustus Nelson (1829–1891), American politician and Civil War colonel
 Homer Nelson (Wisconsin politician) (1826–?), American politician